Mount Chinghee is a national park in Queensland, Australia,  south of Brisbane.  It is part of the Shield Volcano Group of the World Heritage Site Gondwana Rainforests of Australia inscribed in 1986 and added to the Australian National Heritage List in 2007.  It is also part of the Scenic Rim Important Bird Area, identified as such by BirdLife International because of its importance in the conservation of several species of threatened birds.

It was initially called Telemon Environment Park until it was gazetted as Mount Chinghee National Park in 1994.
The national park has no walking tracks or visitor facilities.

See also

 Protected areas of Queensland

References

National parks of South East Queensland
Protected areas established in 1994
Gondwana Rainforests of Australia
Important Bird Areas of Queensland
1994 establishments in Australia
Scenic Rim Region